The Japanese Brown (Akage Washu or , Aka Ushi) is a breed of small Japanese beef cattle. It is one of six native Japanese cattle breeds, and one of the four Japanese breeds known as wagyū, the others being the Japanese Black, the Japanese Polled and the Japanese Shorthorn.
All wagyū cattle derive from cross-breeding in the early twentieth century of native Japanese cattle with imported stock, mostly from Europe. In the case of the Japanese Brown, the principal foreign influence was from the Korean Hanwoo and Swiss Simmental breeds.

Etymology 
The Kanji characters  literally mean "red cow."

History 

Cattle were brought to Japan from China at the same time as the cultivation of rice, in about the second century AD, in the Yayoi period. Until about the time of the Meiji Restoration in 1868, they were used only as draught animals, in agriculture, forestry, mining and for transport, and as a source of fertiliser. Milk consumption was unknown, and – for cultural and religious reasons – meat was not eaten. Cattle were highly prized and valuable, too expensive for a poor farmer to buy.

Japan was effectively isolated from the rest of the world from 1635 until 1854; there was no possibility of intromission of foreign genes to the cattle population during this time. Between  1868, the year of the Meiji Restoration, and 1887, some 2600 foreign cattle were imported. At first there was little interest in cross-breeding these with native stock, but from about 1900 it became widespread. It ceased abruptly in 1910, when it was realised that, while the cross-breeds might be larger and have better dairy qualities, their working capacity and meat quality was lower. From 1919, the various heterogeneous regional populations that resulted from this brief period of cross-breeding were registered and selected as "Improved Japanese Cattle". Four separate strains were characterised, based mainly on which type of foreign cattle had most influenced the hybrids, and were recognised as breeds in 1944. These were the four wagyū breeds, the Japanese Brown, the Japanese Black, the Japanese Polled and the Japanese Shorthorn.

The Japanese Brown developed in southern Japan, in Kōchi Prefecture on Shikoku island, and in Kumamoto Prefecture on Kyushu island. The principal foreign influences on the breed were from the British Devon, Korean Hanwoo and Swiss Simmental cattle breeds.

The Japanese Brown constitutes about 4.8% of the national beef herd. The conservation status of the Japanese Brown was listed by the FAO as "not at risk" in 2007.

A small number were exported to the United States in 1994.

Characteristics 

Japanese Brown cattle in Kōchi Prefecture are reddish-brown, while those in Kumamoto Prefecture are light brown; both sexes are horned.

References

Beef cattle breeds
Cattle breeds originating in Japan
Cattle breeds